Cristian Benavente Bristol (born 19 May 1994) is a professional footballer who plays for Alianza Lima, as an attacking midfielder. Born in Spain, he represents the Peru national team.

Club career

Real Madrid
Born in Alcalá de Henares, to Peruvian Parents of Quechua Descent, Benavente joined Real Madrid's youth system in 2002, aged 8. In the 2013 summer, while still a junior, he was named to Real Madrid Castilla's pre-season squad for the 2012–13 season. In the same campaign he also was Juvenil A topscorer, netting 18 goals.

In July 2013, Benavente was promoted to Castilla, and made his professional debut on 24 August, playing the last 11 minutes of a 0–1 home loss against AD Alcorcón, in the Segunda División championship.

Milton Keynes Dons
On 17 July 2015, Benavente joined English Championship club Milton Keynes Dons, signing a two-year deal on a free transfer. On 11 August 2015, Benavente made his debut in a 2–1 League Cup first round win over Leyton Orient. On 5 January 2016, following limited first team opportunities, Benavente was released from the club.

Charleroi
Benavente then signed for Belgian club Charleroi in 2016.

Pyramids
In January 2019, he moved to Egyptian club Pyramids FC.

Nantes
In August 2019, he was loaned to French club FC Nantes

Royal Antwerp
In October 2020, he was loaned out to Belgian side Royal Antwerp On 31 January 2021, Benavente left Royal Antwerp, due to a lack of playing time.

Charleroi 
On 1 February 2021, Benavente moved to Belgium club Charleroi, on a loan deal with an option to buy.

Alianza Lima 
In February 2022, Benavente was signed for Peruvian club Alianza Lima. He scored in his debut.

International career
After appearing with the under-17 and under-20 teams, Benavente made his full squad debut on 18 April 2013, as a half-time substitute in a 0–0 friendly draw against Mexico at Candlestick Park in San Francisco. He scored his first international goal on 1 June 2013, the winner in a 2–1 victory over Panama.

Personal life
His mother, Magali Bristol, was a retired volleyball player for Peru's U15 and U20 teams, and is a part owner of Zest nightclub in Ipswich.

Career statistics

Club

International goals
As of match played 23 May 2016. Peru score listed first, score column indicates score after each Benavente goal.

References

External links
 
 
La Preferente 

1994 births
Living people
People from Alcalá de Henares
Citizens of Peru through descent
Peruvian people of Spanish descent
Spanish people of Peruvian descent
Footballers from the Community of Madrid
Peruvian footballers
Association football midfielders
Real Madrid Castilla footballers
Milton Keynes Dons F.C. players
R. Charleroi S.C. players
Pyramids FC players
FC Nantes players
Segunda División players
Segunda División B players
English Football League players
Belgian Pro League players
Egyptian Premier League players
Ligue 1 players
Peru youth international footballers
Peru under-20 international footballers
Peru international footballers
Copa América Centenario players
Peruvian expatriate footballers
Peruvian expatriate sportspeople in England
Peruvian expatriate sportspeople in Belgium
Peruvian expatriate sportspeople in Egypt
Peruvian expatriate sportspeople in France
Expatriate footballers in England
Expatriate footballers in Belgium
Expatriate footballers in Egypt
Expatriate footballers in France